The grey bamboo shark, Chiloscyllium griseum, is a species of carpet shark in the family Hemiscylliidae, found in the Indo-West Pacific Oceans from the Arabian Sea to Pakistan, India, Malaysia, Thailand, Indonesia, China, Japan, the Philippines, and Papua New Guinea, between latitudes 34° N and 10° S, and longitude 60° E and 150° E.  Its length is up to 74 cm.

Features: Adults are brown and have no coloration but the juveniles have transverse dark bands.

Reproduction is Oviparous (egg laying).

Classified as Vulnerable (VU) on the IUCN Red List

See also

 List of sharks

References

grey bamboo shark
Marine fauna of South Asia
Marine fauna of Southeast Asia
Fish of China
grey bamboo shark